Eight ships of the Royal Navy have borne the name HMS Defender:

 , a 12-gun Courser-class gun-brig launched in 1797 and on the Navy List until 1802.
 , a 14-gun Archer-class gun-brig launched in 1804 and wrecked in 1809.
 , an 8-gun lugger, previously the French privateer Beau Marseille.
 , a second-class colonial-service torpedo boat built in 1883 for service in New Zealand and abandoned at Lyttelton, New Zealand sometime after 1900. Her remains can be seen at the Torpedo Boat Museum, Magazine Bay, Lyttelton. 
 , a D-class destroyer launched in 1932 and sunk in 1941.
 , a  destroyer launched in 1950 and broken up in 1972.
 , a Type 45 destroyer launched on 21 October 2009.

The name was also used between 1941(?) and 1945 for a small shore establishment just outside Liverpool.

Battle honours
Ships named Defender have earned the following battle honours:
Heligoland, 1914
Dogger Bank, 1915
Jutland, 1916
Calabria, 1940
Spartivento, 1940
Matapan, 1941
Malta Convoys, 1941
Greece, 1941
Crete, 1941
Libya, 1941

Royal Navy ship names